Benignus was a martyr at Todi, Umbria, in 303, under the persecution of Diocletian.

Benignus is one of the 140 Colonnade saints which adorn St. Peter's Square.

References

303 deaths
Saints from Roman Italy
4th-century Christian martyrs
4th-century Romans
Year of birth unknown